Shekarabad (also Romanized as Shekarābād) is a village in Fathabad Rural District, in the Central District of Baft County, Kerman Province, Iran. At the 2006 census, its population was 58, in 15 families.

References 

Populated places in Baft County